Nāsir ad-Dīn Naṣrat Shāh (r. 1519–1533), also known as Nusrat Shah, was the second Sultan of Bengal belonging to the Hussain Shahi dynasty. He continued with his father's expansionist policies but by 1526, had to contend with the Mughal ascendency in the Battle of Ghaghra. Simultaneously, Nasrat Shah's reign also suffered a reverse at the hands of the Ahom kingdom. The reigns of Alauddin Husain Shah and Nasrat Shah are generally regarded as the "golden age" of the Bengal Sultanate.

Early life and background
Nasrat was born into an aristocratic Sunni Muslim family in the Bengal Sultanate. His father Alauddin Husain Shah was the first Sultan of the Hussain Shahi dynasty and the father of eighteen sons and at least eleven daughters. Among Nasrat's siblings were Danyal and Mahmud.

Nasrat Shah married a daughter of Ibrahim Lodi, who was the Pashtun ruler of the neighbouring Delhi Sultanate.

Reign
After his father's death in 1519, Nasrat rose to the throne as Nasiruddin Nasrat Shah. Trailing the policies of his father, Nasrat Shah expanded the Sultanate territory early on in his reign and Khalifatabad emerged as an important mint-town. Following Babur's invasion of India, Mahmud Lodi and his Afghan confederates fled to Bengal for safety. In 1527, Babur despatched an envoy to Bengal in order to deduce Nasrat Shah's attitude towards Mughal ascendency and collect some information regarding Bengal. Nasrat Shah did not respond and imprisoned the envoy. However, Nasrat Shah later negotiated peace deals and freed the envoy, in order to send gifts to Babur. Babur was pleased with the response; describing Nasrat as one of the great rulers of the Indian subcontinent, praising Bengali soldiers for their gunnery and navy, and recognised the loyalty of Bengalis for their leader.

After being pestered by the Afghans, the Mughals declared war against them and their Bengali allies. Attempting to defeat the Afghans on the way, the Mughals proceeded towards Bengal. Babur took control of Tirhut before stopping at Buxar, where he requested Bengal to dismiss their troops camped at the banks of the Ghaghara. Nasrat Shah's refusal led to the Battle of Ghaghra, taking place on 6 May 1529, in which the Mughals fought the Afghans and Bengalis. The Mughal Empire were victorious, and their territory extended to Ghaghara's eastern bank in Bihar though they did not penetrate Bengal. Nasrat Shah maintained Bengal's status as an independent nation.

He completed the building of Baro Shona Masjid in Gauḍa (city) in 1526 AD. 8

See also
List of rulers of Bengal
History of Bengal

References

1532 deaths
1519 in India
Year of birth unknown
16th-century Indian monarchs
Hussain Shahi dynasty
16th-century Bengalis